Route 207 is a collector road in the Canadian province of Nova Scotia. It is located in the Halifax Regional Municipality and connects Dartmouth to Porters Lake on the Eastern Shore.

Route description

Dartmouth

Called Portland Street at its western end, the route starts at Alderney Drive (Trunk 7) across from the city hall of the former city of Dartmouth. There it proceeds where it intersects with Prince Albert Road (Trunk 7), Alderney Drive and Canal Street. Further along, Portland Street junctions with Route 322 at Pleasant Street, and Albert Street, an area in Dartmouth called "The five corners" . It passes through the Southdale area of Dartmouth, then expands to a four-lane street where it crosses the Circumferential Highway to the Portland valley area. it then extends up an incline named "Breakheart Hill " to the community of Cole Harbour.

Eastern Shore
In Cole Harbour, starting at Caldwell Road the road is named "Cole Harbour Road." At (Bissett Road) Route 207 narrows to two lanes. The road leads here to Lawrencetown Beach in Upper Lawerenceton. The route connects the communities of Dartmouth, Upper Lawrencetown, West Lawrencetown, Three Fathom Harbour, Seaforth, Grand Desert and West Chezzetcook, before ending in Porters Lake  at Trunk 7 and Highway 107).

Communities
Dartmouth
Cole Harbour
Upper Lawrencetown
West Lawrencetown
Lawrencetown
Lloy
Three Fathom Harbour
Seaforth
Grand Desert
West Chezzetcook
Porters Lake

See also
List of Nova Scotia provincial highways

References

Nova Scotia provincial highways
Roads in Halifax, Nova Scotia